Star Trek: The Next Generation Role-playing Game is a role-playing game set in the fictional Star Trek universe and published by Last Unicorn Games (LUG). Due to licensing issues, LUG did not release the game as a single core rulebook and setting supplements for the various series but instead intended to release a corebook for every series. The Star Trek license was lost to Decipher before a Star Trek: Voyager rulebook could be released.

Published materials

The Next Generation (TNG)
25000 - Star Trek: The Next Generation Role-playing Game (hardcover) 
25001 - TNG Narrator's Toolkit (book & screen)
25002 - TNG Player's Guide (hardcover) 
25100 - The Price of Freedom: The United Federation of Planets Sourcebook (hardcover)
25101 - The First Line: Starfleet Intelligence Handbook
25102 - Planets of the UFP: A Guide to Federation Worlds.
25103 - The Way of Kolinahr: The Vulcans 
25300 - A Fragile Peace: The Neutral Zone Campaign Volume 1
25301 - Planetary Adventures Volume 1: Federation Space 
25303 - Holodeck Adventures  
25500 - The Way of D'era: The Romulan Star Empire (Boxed Set) 
25501 - Starfleet Academy (Boxed Set)

Deep Space Nine (DS9)

The Original Series (TOS)

The Expanded Universe (Non-specific setting)
15002 - All Our Yesterdays: The Time Travel Sourcebook

Miniatures
25600 - Federation Away Team Miniatures (Boxed set containing 7 miniatures)

Web enhancements
Last Unicorn Games was one of the first roleplaying companies to use the concept of releasing additional pages for published books via the web. LUG dubbed these "Icon Links," in reference to their overall "Icon System" game mechanics (the term Web Enhancement  hadn't been invented yet). Unlike current web enhancements, which are simply additions that can be added to the end of a book, LUG took a unique approach, by planning the enhancements ahead of time, and printing a small Icon symbol at various points in a given book, informing the reader that additional material on the subject-at-hand was available on the company's website to read or 
download and print. These enhancements are now being stored online, and can be downloaded from Memory Icon, under the Icon Links section.

Unpublished materials
Many additional books and supplements were planned, and quite a few had various chapters already written, in varying degrees of completion. LUG's former writing pool has been extremely generous and supportive of the fan-movement to keep the game alive and expand on it. In support of this, much of the unpublished material has been released for the fans. 

S. John Ross has posted his unfinished manuscripts on the Untaken Treks pages of his website.

Steve Kenson has posted his unfinished manuscripts on the Star Trek: The Lost Episodes pages of his website. 

Of all the LUG writers, Steven S. Long has been the most active amongst the fan movement. Not only did he dust-off his unfinished materials for the fans, he opted to finish them on his own time, for no pay. Even more, he continued this work beyond the originally envisioned volumes, to ultimately present the fans with seven whole new books, absolutely free. 

The Fires of Armageddon: The Dominion War Sourcebook (For DS9)

And the Spacedock Series:

The Advanced Starship And Construction Manual
Ship Recognition Manual 1: The Ships of Starfleet
Ship Recognition Manual 2: The Cardassian Union
Ship Recognition Manual 3: The Klingon Empire
Ship Recognition Manual 4: The Original Series Era
Ship Recognition Manual 5: The Romulan Star Empire

They can be downloaded in PDF form from Memory Icon, under the Spacedock section, and are suitable for printing.

Reception
The reviewer from the online second volume of Pyramid stated that "The ST:TNG RPG (how's that for an abbreviation?) captures the feel of the Next Generation television show right off. The cover is striking and the graphics throughout impressive, done in the "Starfleet" style of icons created for the series."

Star Trek: The Next Generation Role-playing Game received the 1998 Origins Award for Best Role-playing Game.

References

Last Unicorn Games games
Origins Award winners
Role-playing games based on Star Trek
Role-playing games introduced in 1998